The Township of Granby (French: Canton de Granby) was a township municipality in south-central Quebec, Canada in the La Haute-Yamaska Regional County Municipality. Its territory comprised the northern and western sections of the present-day City of Granby.

In 2006, citizens of the City of Granby and the Township of Granby voted in referendum for the township to merge into the City of Granby. Since January 1, 2007, it is a single city.

According to the Canada 2011 Census:
Population: 63,433

According to the Canada 2001 Census:
Population: 11,335
% Change (1996-2001): 0.6
Dwellings: 3,810
Area (km².): 80.67
Density (persons per km².): 140.5

Communities
Mawcook—Near Rivière Mawcook, northwestern area of the township.

See also
Town of Granby

References

Communities in Montérégie
Former municipalities in Quebec
Granby, Quebec
Populated places disestablished in 2007